Mátészalkai MTK (MMTK) is a Hungarian football club based in Mátészalka. Established in 1919, they now play in the Nyír-Wetland league, fourth division in Hungarian football. The highest division they played was in NB II, second division in Hungarian football in 1940, 1947-1950, and 2000-2005. They play their home games at MTK Stadion.

Previous names 
The club was also known as Mátészalka TK, Mátészalkai DTK, Mátészalkai Építők, Mátészalkai Spartacus, Mátszalkai MEDOSZ and Mátészalka FC.

See also
Stepan Voitko

References

External links
 Official Website

Football clubs in Hungary
Association football clubs established in 1919
1919 establishments in Hungary